Lindsey Benson Hunter Jr. (born December 3, 1970) is an American former professional basketball player and coach. He played in the National Basketball Association (NBA) from 1993 to 2010, spending  most of his career with the Detroit Pistons. He was also the interim head coach of the Phoenix Suns in 2013. Most recently, he served as the head coach at Mississippi Valley State.

Basketball career
After playing basketball at Murrah High School in Jackson, Mississippi, alongside phenom James Robinson, Hunter enrolled at Alcorn State University, then transferred to Jackson State University after his freshman year. While playing for the Jackson State Tigers, he became arguably the school's highest profile athlete since the days of Walter Payton and Jackie Slater.

The Detroit Pistons had two first-round picks in the 1993 NBA draft. They selected Hunter with the 10th pick and chose Tennessee guard Allan Houston with the 11th. As a rookie, Hunter played in all 82 games, while averaging 10.3 points and what would be a career-high 4.8 assists per game. During the 1996-97 NBA season, Hunter averaged a career-high 14.2 points per game, before then averaging a playoff career-high 15 points per game during a 3–2 first round loss to the Hawks. His first stint in Detroit lasted from 1993 to 2000 when he was traded to the Milwaukee Bucks for Billy Owens. He was a key role player  with the Bucks for one season, playing the fifth-most minutes of any Buck en route to the team’s 4–3 Eastern Conference Finals loss, before being sent to the Los Angeles Lakers in exchange for Greg Foster the following season. Hunter was a contributor on the Lakers team that won the NBA championship in 2001–02.

Following that season, Hunter was dealt again (on draft night 2002), this time to the Toronto Raptors, along with the rights to Chris Jefferies, for Tracy Murray and Kareem Rush. In August 2003, the Pistons re-acquired Hunter by sending Michael Curry to the Raptors. He was traded to the Boston Celtics in February 2004 along with Chucky Atkins and Detroit's 2004 first-round draft pick for Mike James, in order to make the salary cap figures work out for the trade that brought Rasheed Wallace to the Pistons. Hunter never played a game for the Celtics; he was immediately released and re-signed by Detroit a week later. Hunter and the Pistons went on to win the 2003–04 NBA championship. Hunter and the Pistons went back to the Finals in 2004–2005, but Detroit lost the series in seven games to the San Antonio Spurs. During the Pistons Finals runs, Hunter was credited a tenacious on-ball defender off the bench. He was credited with guarding Jason Kidd, Kobe Bryant, and Tony Parker in Detroit's two Finals runs.

On March 7, 2007, Hunter was suspended for ten games after testing positive for phentermine. He claimed he was using his wife's diet pills, which made him test positive for the banned substance.

Hunter signed a one-year nonguaranteed contract with the Chicago Bulls on November 13, 2008. On July 13, 2009, Hunter re-signed with the Bulls for the veteran minimum of $1.3 million. At age 39, Hunter was the oldest player active during the 2009–2010 NBA season—until the Bulls waived him on March 3, 2010 (to make room for Chris Richard). Two days later, the Bulls hired him as a player development assistant.

Coaching career
On August 28, 2012, Hunter signed with the Phoenix Suns as an assistant coach for player development. After the Suns opened the season with a 13–28 record, Hunter was named Phoenix's interim head coach, replacing Alvin Gentry on January 20, 2013. In his head coaching debut, Hunter led the Suns to a 106–96 victory over the Sacramento Kings. In May 2013, Hunter was replaced by Jeff Hornacek. On September 18, 2013, Hunter joined the Golden State Warriors as an assistant coach.

On June 13, 2016, Hunter was named an assistant coach on Nate Oats' staff at the University at Buffalo.

On April 20, 2019, Hunter was named the head coach at Mississippi Valley State University. He went 7–74 in three years at the helm before stepping down in March 2022.

NBA career statistics

Regular season

|-
| align="left" | 
| align="left" | Detroit
| 82 || 26 || 26.5 || .375 || .333 || .732 || 2.3 || 4.8 || 1.5 || .1 || 10.3
|-
| align="left" | 
| align="left" | Detroit
| 42 || 26 || 22.5 || .374 || .333 || .727 || 1.8 || 3.8 || 1.2 || .2 || 7.5
|-
| align="left" | 
| align="left" | Detroit
| 80 || 48 || 26.7 || .381 || .405 || .700 || 2.4 || 2.4 || 1.1 || .2 || 8.5
|-
| align="left" | 
| align="left" | Detroit
| 82 || 76 || 36.9 || .404 || .355 || .778 || 2.8 || 1.9 || 1.6 || .3 || 14.2
|-
| align="left" | 
| align="left" | Detroit
| 71 || 67 || 35.3 || .383 || .321 || .740 || 3.5 || 3.2 || 1.7 || .1 || 12.1
|-
| align="left" | 
| align="left" | Detroit
| 49 || 49 || 35.8 || .435 || .386 || .753 || 3.4 || 3.9 || 1.8 || .2 || 11.9
|-
| align="left" | 
| align="left" | Detroit
| 82 || 82 || 35.6 || .425 || .432 || .760 || 3.0 || 4.0 || 1.6 || .3 || 12.7
|-
| align="left" | 
| align="left" | Milwaukee
| 82 || 5 || 24.4 || .381 || .373 || .802 || 2.1 || 2.7 || 1.2 || .1 || 10.1
|-
| style="text-align:left;background:#afe6ba;"| †
| align="left" | L.A. Lakers
| 82 || 47 || 19.7 || .382 || .380 || .500 || 1.5 || 1.6 || .8 || .2 || 5.8
|-
| align="left" | 
| align="left" | Toronto
| 29 || 0 || 23.2 || .351 || .318 || .723 || 2.0 || 2.4 || 1.2 || .2 || 9.7
|-
|  style="text-align:left; background:#afe6ba;"| †
| align="left" | Detroit
| 33 || 8 || 20.0 || .343 || .280 || .625 || 2.0 || 2.6 || 1.2 || .2 || 3.5
|-
| align="left" | 
| align="left" | Detroit
| 76 || 3 || 15.1 || .358 || .274 || .793 || 1.6 || 1.7 || .9 || .2 || 3.8
|-
| align="left" | 
| align="left" | Detroit
| 30 || 1 || 11.8 || .370 || .256 || .500 || 1.3 || 2.1 || .6 || .0 || 2.9
|-
| align="left" | 
| align="left" | Detroit
| 52 || 0 || 14.3 || .385 || .319 || .909 || .9 || 1.8 || .7 || .1 || 4.9
|-
| align="left" | 
| align="left" | Detroit
| 24 || 0 || 9.0 || .344 || .269 || .778 || .5 || 1.4 || .5 || .1 || 2.4
|-
| align="left" | 
| align="left" | Chicago
| 28 || 0 || 9.5 || .329 || .333 || .600 || .4 || 1.3 || .7 || .0 || 2.6
|-
| align="left" | 
| align="left" | Chicago
| 13 || 0 || 9.4 || .167 || .077 || 1.000 || 1.1 || .7 || .1 || .0 || 1.0
|-class="sortbottom"
| align="center" colspan="2"| Career
| 937 || 439 || 24.8 || .388 || .360 || .746 || 2.2 || 2.7 || 1.2 || .2 || 8.5

Playoffs

|-
| align="left" | 1996
| align="left" | Detroit
| 2 || 0 || 18.0 || .250 || .250 || .500 || 1.0 || .5 || .5 || .0 || 3.0
|-
| align="left" | 1997
| align="left" | Detroit
| 5 || 5 || 40.2 || .439 || .414 || .714 || 3.6 || 1.2 || 1.2 || .2 || 15.0
|-
| align="left" | 1999
| align="left" | Detroit
| 5 || 5 || 36.0 || .264 || .273 || 1.000 || 3.0 || 2.4 || 1.4 || .0 || 7.2
|-
| align="left" | 2000
| align="left" | Detroit
| 3 || 3 || 31.0 || .313 || .111 || .667 || 2.3 || 1.7 || 1.7 || .3 || 8.3
|-
| align="left" | 2001
| align="left" | Milwaukee
| 18 || 0 || 16.1 || .242 || .151 || .727 || 1.7 || 1.9 || .8 || .2 || 3.6
|-
| style="text-align:left;background:#afe6ba;"| 2002†
| align="left" | L.A. Lakers
| 18 || 0 || 7.3 || .311 || .276 || .000 || .4 || .6 || .1 || .0 || 2.0
|-
|  style="text-align:left; background:#afe6ba;"| 2004†
| align="left" | Detroit
| 23 || 0 || 11.9 || .292 || .233 || .917 || 1.4 || .9 || .8 || .2 || 2.4
|-
| align="left" | 2005
| align="left" | Detroit
| 25 || 0 || 15.0 || .319 || .222 || .727 || 1.6 || 1.6 || .9 || .3 || 3.8
|-
| align="left" | 2006
| align="left" | Detroit
| 18 || 0 || 12.1 || .333 || .318 || 1.000 || 1.1 || 1.6 || .8 || .1 || 4.2
|-
| align="left" | 2007
| align="left" | Detroit
| 13 || 0 || 10.2 || .226 || .222 || 1.000 || .8 || 1.2 || .5 || .1 || 1.8
|-
| align="left" | 2008
| align="left" | Detroit
| 11 || 0 || 10.5 || .381 || .455 || .000 || .9 || 1.3 || .7 || .0 || 1.9
|-
| align="left" | 2009
| align="left" | Chicago
| 6 || 0 || 4.0 || .333 || .333 || .750 || .8 || .8 || .3 || .0 || 1.0
|-class="sortbottom"
| align="center" colspan="2"| Career
| 147 || 13 || 14.1 || .309 || .260 || .810 || 1.3 || 1.3 || .7 || .1 || 3.5

Head coaching record

NCAA DI

NBA

|-
| style="text-align:left;"|Phoenix
| style="text-align:left;"|
|41||12||29|||| style="text-align:center;"|5th in Pacific||—||—||—||—
| style="text-align:center;"|Missed Playoffs
|- class="sortbottom"
| style="text-align:left;"|Career
| ||41||12||29|||| ||—||—||—||—

References

External links

 Lindsey Hunter at NBA.com
 Lindsey Hunter Stats at ESPN.com
 Lindsey Hunter NBA Statistics at Basketball-Reference.com
 Lindsey Hunter College Basketball Statistics at Sports-Reference.com

1970 births
Living people
20th-century African-American sportspeople
21st-century African-American sportspeople
Alcorn State Braves basketball players
African-American basketball players
American expatriate basketball people in Canada
American men's basketball players
Basketball coaches from Mississippi
Basketball players from Mississippi
Buffalo Bulls men's basketball coaches
Chicago Bulls players
Detroit Pistons draft picks
Detroit Pistons players
Doping cases in basketball
Golden State Warriors assistant coaches
Jackson State Tigers basketball players
Los Angeles Lakers players
Milwaukee Bucks players
Mississippi Valley State Delta Devils basketball coaches
People from Utica, Mississippi
Phoenix Suns assistant coaches
Phoenix Suns head coaches
Point guards
Toronto Raptors players